Steinchisma is a genus of plants in the grass family, native to the Americas but a few of them naturalized in Africa.

 Species
 Steinchisma cupreum (Hitchc. & Chase) W.V.Br. - Durango, Jalisco, Zacatecas, México State, Puebla, Veracruz, Querétaro
 Steinchisma decipiens (Nees ex Trin.) W.V.Br. - Colombia, Venezuela, Brazil, Paraguay, Uruguay, Argentina
 Steinchisma exiguiflorum (Griseb.) W.V.Br. - Bahamas, Greater Antilles
 Steinchisma hians (Elliott) Nash - southeastern + south-central United States (New Mexico to Virginia); Latin America (Tamaulipas to Uruguay); naturalized in KwaZulu-Natal
 Steinchisma laxum (Sw.) Zuloaga - from Florida + Durango to Argentina incl. Galápagos; naturalized in tropical West Africa, Assam, Ascension Island 
 Steinchisma spathellosum (Döll) Renvoize - Brazil (Paraná, Rio Grande do Sol, Santa Catarina, 	São Paulo), Paraguay (Alto Paraná, Cordillera, Paraguarí), Argentina (Buenos Aires, D.F., Misiones, Entre Ríos)
 Steinchisma stenophyllum (Hack.) Zuloaga & Morrone - Colombia, Venezuela (Amazonas), Suriname, Brazil (Bahia, Pará, Goiás, Minas Gerais, Mato Grosso)

References

Panicoideae
Poaceae genera
Taxa named by Constantine Samuel Rafinesque